John William Steffensen (born 30 August 1982) is an Australian former track and field athlete, who specialised in 200 and 400 metres. He won silver at the 2004 Olympics in Athens. His personal bests were 20.79 and 44.73.

Biography
Born in Perth, Western Australia, to South African immigrant parents, Steffensen competed in the 2004 Olympics, and was a part of the Australian team that won the silver medal in the 4 × 400 metres relay.

Steffensen won the gold medal in the 400 m at the 2006 Commonwealth Games in Melbourne, with a time of 44.73, setting a new personal best.  He won a second gold medal as the first runner in the 4 × 400 m Australian relay team at the 2006 Commonwealth Games.

He boycotted the 2010 Commonwealth Games after a series of disputes with Athletics Australia, which he accused of mismanaging athletes.

He is an old boy of Trinity College, Perth, and Guildford Grammar School, Perth (92-96).

He was runner up to Stephanie Rice in the 2013 Australian version of the television program Celebrity Apprentice. Since then, he has been making regular appearances on Nine Network's Wide World of Sports as a co-host.

Steffensen collaborated with Athletics Australia to develop the Nitro Athletics track and field series, which included variations on the traditional one-day athletics meeting with the intention of widening the sport's fanbase.

Steffensen made his first step into motor racing at Sandown in 2017 driving a Porsche 997 GT3 Cup in the Porsche GT3 Cup Challenge series with Zagame Motorsport backed by Repair Management Australia. He finished the championship in eighth and moved immediately into the Porsche Carrera Cup Australia in 2018 driving in the Porsche Centre Melbourne team.

References

External links
 Official website

 Athletics Australia profile
 John Steffensen - Dexion Brand Ambassador

1982 births
Living people
Athletes from Perth, Western Australia
Australian male sprinters
Olympic athletes of Australia
Olympic silver medalists for Australia
Olympic silver medalists in athletics (track and field)
Athletes (track and field) at the 2004 Summer Olympics
Athletes (track and field) at the 2008 Summer Olympics
Athletes (track and field) at the 2012 Summer Olympics
Medalists at the 2004 Summer Olympics
Commonwealth Games gold medallists for Australia
Commonwealth Games medallists in athletics
Athletes (track and field) at the 2006 Commonwealth Games
Athletes (track and field) at the 2014 Commonwealth Games
World Athletics Championships athletes for Australia
World Athletics Championships medalists
The Apprentice Australia candidates
Australian racing drivers
People educated at Trinity College, Perth
People educated at Guildford Grammar School
Australian people of South African descent
Medallists at the 2006 Commonwealth Games